Reginald Lewis (1942–1993) was an American businessman.

Reginald, Reg or Reggie Lewis may also refer to:

Reggie Lewis (1965–1993), American basketball player
Reggie Lewis (cornerback) (born 1984), American football cornerback
Reggie Lewis (defensive lineman) (1954–2008), American football defensive lineman
Reggie P. Lewis, American football defensive lineman
Reg Lewis (footballer) (1920–1997), English footballer
Reg Lewis (bodybuilder) (1936–2021), American bodybuilder and actor
Reginald Henry Lewis (1894–1973), English painter
Reginald Lewis (cricketer), South African cricketer